John Duncan McNie  (July 28, 1920 – September 2, 2006) was a politician in Ontario, Canada. He was a Progressive Conservative who served in the Legislative Assembly of Ontario from 1971 until 1975 representing the riding of Hamilton West. He served in the cabinet of Bill Davis from 1972 to 1975.

Background
McNie was born in Scotland. He emigrated to Canada, settled in Hamilton, Ontario and married Mary Kathleen Skeans (1929–1980). Prior to being elected, McNie managed Kelley Advertising from the mid-1950s to 1971.

Politics
He was elected in the general election in 1971. In 1972 he was appointed to cabinet as Minister of Colleges and Universities. In 1974 he was demoted to the position of Minister without portfolio. McNie had asked Davis to reduce his workload due to health reasons. He did not stand for re election in the 1975 general election.

Cabinet posts

Later life
After leaving politics, he has served as a Co-Chair of the "Committee for Hamilton Place", as a Director at The Hamilton Council for a United Canada and as a Director of a private company, Maplex Management & Holdings Limited.

McNie died in Hamilton, Ontario.

References

External links
 

1920 births
2006 deaths
Canadian people of Scottish descent
Members of the Executive Council of Ontario
Progressive Conservative Party of Ontario MPPs